Ptychotrygon is a genus of sawfish-like Late Cretaceous ray whose fossils have been found worldwide. It, Ptychotrygonoides, Texatrygon, and Asflapristis are members of the family Ptychotrygonidae within the suborder Sclerorhynchoidei.

Species 
The following species are considered valid:

 †Ptychotrygon blainensis
 †Ptychotrygon eutawensis
 †Ptychotrygon geyeri
 †Ptychotrygon mcnultyi
 †Ptychotrygon pustulata
 †Ptychotrygon rostrispatula
 †Ptychotrygon striata
 †Ptychotrygon triangularis
 †Ptychotrygon vermiculata

References

Prehistoric cartilaginous fish genera
Late Cretaceous cartilaginous fish
Late Cretaceous fish of North America
Sclerorhynchoidei
Fossil taxa described in 1894